The 2002 Minnesota House of Representatives election was held in the U.S. state of Minnesota on November 5, 2002, to elect members to the House of Representatives of the 83rd Minnesota Legislature. A primary election was held on September 10, 2002.

The Republican Party of Minnesota won a majority of seats, remaining the majority party, followed by the Minnesota Democratic–Farmer–Labor Party (DFL). The new Legislature convened on January 7, 2003.

Results

See also
 Minnesota Senate election, 2002
 Minnesota gubernatorial election, 2002

References

2002 Minnesota elections
Minnesota House of Representatives elections
Minnesota House of Representatives